Powys Archives is the record and repository office providing archival services for the Powys County Council. Located in Llandrindod Wells, the archive is responsible for collecting, curating and preservation, and provides access to records about marriages, family history, buildings and other information relating to the county for research and personal use.

The archives house collections from the 14th century and are available for view in the archive's search room by members of the public.

History 
The Powys County Archives was established in 1974 as an archive for the newly created county of Powys and the three former counties of Breconshire, Montgomeryshire, Radnorshire. Its remit includes collection and preserving official county records, local historical archives and other public records.

The County Archives was originally located with the main County Council offices at the old Gwalia Hotel in Llandrindod Wells, before moving to a new purpose-built County Hall site in 1990. In October 2017, the archives moved to its current home in a specially adapted unit on Ddole Road.

Collections
The archives holds a number of important historical collections relating to the history of Powys. These include official records such as county court and shrievalty documents dated as far back as Saxon times, hospital and health authority records of Breconshire, Montgomeryshire, Radnorshire, and the modern county of Powys amongst others. The archive also provides access to census returns from 1841 - 1911 and a huge collections on house history, local newspapers, maps, nonconformists' records, registers of electors, freeholders' and jurors' lists, making the archives popular with family and local history researchers.

In 2004 a number of royal records were discovered in the archives, shedding light on the fashion habits of Queen Victoria and other European monarchs.

References

External links 
 Stori Powys Website

Archives in Wales
Llandrindod Wells